John Cobethorn was Dean of Exeter between 1415 and 1419.

Notes

Deans of Exeter
15th-century English people